Ireland competed at the 1980 Summer Paralympics in Arnhem, Netherlands. 24 competitors from Ireland won 17 medals including 4 gold, 2 silver and 11 bronze and finished 25th in the medal table.

See also 
 Ireland at the Paralympics
 Ireland at the 1980 Summer Olympics

References 

Ireland at the Paralympics
1980 in Irish sport
Nations at the 1980 Summer Paralympics